The Goya Award for Best Makeup and Hairstyles (Spanish: Premio Goya al mejor maquillaje y peluquería) is one of the Goya Awards, Spain's principal national film awards. The category was first presented at the first edition of the Goya Awards with Fernando  Florido being the first winner for his work in Dragon Rapide (1986).

José Quetglas holds the record of the most wins in this category with seven, followed by José Antonio Sánchez with five wins. At the European  Film Awards, Yolanda Piña, Félix Terrero and Nacho Díaz received the award for Best Makeup and Hairstyling for The Endless Trench (2020).

Winners and nominees

1980s

1990s

2000s

2010s

2020s

References

External links
Official site
IMDb: Goya Awards

Goya Awards
Makeup awards